Shauna Burns is an American singer, songwriter, pianist, and recording artist.

Early life 
Shauna Burns' mother (originally from Utah) and father (from Nevada) settled in Miami, Florida. Shauna Burns began on her musical path as a child watching and imitating her mother play the piano. Eventually her mother began teaching her chords, playing technique, and songs (often Broadway musical tunes). She began to find her own artistic identity in her pre-teen years, 
along with a widening of her musical interests. Shauna began composing around the age of 12 and started to take music more seriously. After watching a Depeche Mode performance, Shauna had an epiphany that she too would have a career as a performer. Her vision was strengthened by the success of other female artists such as Tori Amos, Sinéad O'Connor, and Sarah McLachlan.

Career
After graduating with a Bachelor's degree in Anthropology from the University of Utah, Burns spent a year (from 2003 to 2004) in Europe during which time she began preparing her debut album. Released in 2005 by Red Rock Music, Every Thought was received with critical acclaim. She embarked on a tour of the United States that same year in support of the album. Her vocals and piano are recorded live with the band (Burns on piano and vocals, James Clark on drums and percussion, Ryan Tilby on bass and guitar, Steve Lemmon on guitar, Caroline Kemper on Celtic Harp and Rick Kemper on Irish Whistle) with some post-production vocals and musical fills added. Every Thought was selected as one of the Top CDs of 2005 by Collected Sounds and the single, "Pink Girl", was chosen as the #1 Indie single from the MAACP show and the album was chosen as "Best of the Batch" from the Music Industry News Network.

Every Thought was followed by the 2006 release entitled Desert Tune.  This 5 song EP, which is an extension of Every Thought, has Burns on vocals and piano, James Clark co-producing and on drums and percussions, Steve Lemmon on guitar, and Ryan Tilby on guitar and bass.

The Moon and the Fire Circle was released on 19 February 2008 with a record release show held at The Mint in Los Angeles on the same day.  "Around You" (the first single) was one of WCH Radio's "Top Songs for 2008" and reached number 1 on "Song Vault Radio".  The Moon and the Fire Circle was selected "Best of 2008" by Collected Sounds and The Promise Live.  Radio Crystal Blue also chose Burns as one of the "Top Recording Artists of the Year 2008".

"Around You", the first single from The Moon and the Fire Circle, hit number 7 on the FMQB AC (Adult Contemporary) Chart in April 2008.  It debuted at number 38 and peaked at number 7.

The continuation of The Moon and the Fire Circle is the follow-up EP Anamnesis, released on 14 April 2009.  Anamnesis, which means "recollection" or "remembrance", focuses on the senses that live in memories.

Burns toured the United States and Europe in 2006 and 2007 in support of Every Thought and Desert Tune with over 55 shows and appearances.  The Moon and the Fire Circle tour kicked off on 6 March 2008 in Portland, Oregon, with over 25 shows and appearances throughout the year mostly with her band. Burns hit the road again with her Wandering Planets Tour that started in Flagstaff, Arizona on 24 April 2009.

A Winter Gathering was released on 25 October 2011. Burns then released Violet, containing 14 songs.  With new songs titled “Orchid” and “Portobello”, Burns has stated that this album will have a positive, uplifting spirit.   Her first single, “Little Song,” from the album, is already receiving airplay from several radio stations worldwide.

In 2015 Burns celebrated the 10 Year anniversary of her debut album and released three singles: “Hazel", “Gray Moon”, and "From Flying" from the achieves of recordings done throughout the previous 10 years.

Burns released her cover single of an old-time classic “Scarborough Fair,” on October 6, 2017, through the label Red Rock Music.

Discography 
Every Thought (2005)
Desert Tune (2006)
The Moon and the Fire Circle (2008)
Anamnesis (2009)
A Winter Gathering (2011)
Violet (2013)
Hazel -single (2015)
Gray Moon -single (2015)
From Flying -single (2015)
Scarborough Fair -single (2017)

References

External links
Official website

1981 births
American alternative rock musicians
American women singer-songwriters
American pop pianists
American women pianists
American women pop singers
American rock pianists
American rock songwriters
American women rock singers
Feminist musicians
Living people
21st-century American women singers
21st-century American pianists